Humen Town, formerly Fumun, is a town in Dongguan city on the eastern side of the Humen strait on the Pearl River Delta, in Guangdong province, China. The former town of Taiping was incorporated into Humen Town in 1985. The population was 577,548 in the 2000 census, making it the second most populous town (zhèn) in China (after Chang'an in Dongguan as well).

History

The history of Humen is linked to the First Opium War (1839–1842). It was at Humen that Lin Zexu supervised the destruction of large quantities of seized opium in 1839. Some major battles in the First Opium War were fought here and on the waters of the Bocca Tigris.

Economy
Humen is a thriving city crowded with consumer goods factories. These factories also fueled population expansion from emigrating workers around the country seeking factory jobs. Furthermore, Humen is geographically advantageous for the factories due to its proximity to two large metropolitan cities and export harbors of Hong Kong and mainland China's Shenzhen. Humen has long been an important gateway to south China. Going upstream, ships plying the Pearl River can reach the eastern, northern and western regions of Guangdong and even parts of Guangxi province. The main port, Humen Port, is a first-class port open to foreign vessels.

Tourist attractions

 The "Sea Battle Museum", which has dioramas and displays featuring the First Opium War and the Second Opium War, may be reached by taking number 8A or 8B bus to its westernmost stop.
 The Opium War Museum also known as the Lin Zexu Memorial Museum
 Former Residence of Jiang Guangnai

Several Qing dynasty  forts, including:
 Weiyuan Fort, located near the "Sea Battle Museum" and almost directly under the Humen Pearl River Bridge
 Shajiao Fort; lit. "sand corner" fort), where the Convention of Chuenpi was signed in 1841 during the First Opium War
 Eyi Fort
 Jingyuan Fort
 Zhenyuan Fort

Transportation

Humen is located at the eastern end of the Humen Pearl River Bridge.

Humen is served by regular direct buses traveling south from Guangzhou. Routes continue south by bus to Shenzhen's Window of the World theme park, from which it is possible to continue on to the Hong Kong border by bus or the Shenzhen Metro.

There is a bus service from Humen Town to Shenzhen Bao'an International Airport in Shenzhen. In addition, a ferry service connects Humen Ferry Terminal to Hong Kong International Airport's SkyPier.

References

External links

 Human government website 
 www.humen.com 
 Chinese Wikipedia article about the destruction of opium in Humen
 Opium War Museum website
 Shajiao Fort webpage: click on map

Geography of Dongguan
Towns in Guangdong